"Sometimes It Rains" is a 2006 single by David Charvet, his last release before returning to an acting and television career. The song is co-written by Arnie Roman (who had penned songs for the Pointer Sisters, Celine Dion, Marc Anthony and others) and Ty Lacy (with songs for LeAnn Rimes, Faith Hill, Keith Urban, amongst others).

The song appears in Charvet's third and last album Se laisser quelque chose with Universal Music and his second single from the album, after the initial track "Je te dédie". The song released by Mercury Records and distributed by Universal Music charted in SNEP, the official French singles chart and in Belgium's Ultratip French singles chart.

Track list
Pre-release (1 May 2006)
"Sometimes It Rains" (radio edit) (3:31)

Mercury release (physical, 3 July 2006)
"Sometimes It Rains" (written by Arnie Roman, Ty Lacy) (4:17)
"Damn Shame" (written by David Charvet, Peter Vettese) (3:39)

Music video
A music video was also shot for the single by French director Fabrice Begotti (HappyShooting). The music video shows a soulful Charvet waking at home, taking a morning shower, checking his diary for a certain engagement he takes note of and then going out. On his way, Charvet buys a bouquet of flowers from a street vendor, while heads turn as he walks down the road with eligible women desiring to get his attention and company and he trying to ignore them. Instead, he proceeds to take an almost empty bus, except for a young girl and her mother as makes funny gestures to win her heart. He also notices an apprehensive young man who jumps off the bus to meet an enlisted soldier friend. Eventually Charvet reaches his destination, a cemetery, where he lays the flowers he bought on the tombstone of a fallen relative, that identifies a PFC ("private first class) laid there who had served in World War II. The music video fades away with a message on a black screen that says "in memory of Fifi and Lucette".

Credits
Vocals
Lead vocals – David Charvet
Backing vocals [Chorus] – Claire Worrall, Cyril Paulus, Steve Mc Ewan, Tim Van Der Kuil, William Rousseau
Strings
Conductor [strings] and arranged by [strings] – Nick Ingman
Leader [strings] – Gavin Wright
Strings – The London Session Orchestra
Other instruments
Acoustic guitar – Phil Palmer, Serge Faubert, Steve Power, Tim Van Der Kuil
Bass – David Catlin-Birch, Mick Feat, Phil Spalding
Drums – Damon Wilson, Jeremy Stacey
Electric guitar – Serge Faubert, Tim Van Der Kuil
Harmonica – Mark Feltham
Piano, keyboards – Claire Worrall
Production
Engineer [assistant] – Dan Porter, Sam Miller, Tim Roe
Engineer [pro tools] – James Brumby*
Executive producer – Sandrine Lebars
Producer [artistic direction] – Gérard Beullac
Producer, recorded by, mixed by – Steve Power
Programmed by – Matt Vaughan, Richard Robson
Recorded and mixed at Sanctuary Townhouse Studios, London.
Photography by – David Elofer, Frédérique Veysset

Charts
The single stayed 8 weeks on the French chart.

References

2006 singles
2006 songs
Songs written by Ty Lacy
Song recordings produced by Steve Power
Mercury Records singles
Songs written by Arnie Roman